Three ships of the Royal Australian Navy (RAN) have been named HMAS Melbourne, after Melbourne, the capital city of Victoria.
 , a  light cruiser launched in 1912
 , a Majestic-class light aircraft carrier acquired by the RAN in 1947.
 , an  guided missile frigate launched in 1989

Battle honours
 Rabaul, 1914
 North Sea, 1916–18
 Malaysia, 1965–66
 East Timor, 2000
 Persian Gulf, 2002

Royal Australian Navy ship names